Hefner or Heffner is a German surname meaning 'potter'. It may refer to:

Hefner (band), British rock band

People with the surname Hefner
Avraham Heffner, (1935–2014), Israeli filmmaker
Bill Hefner (1930–2009), US Representative from North Carolina
Bob Heffner (born 1938), Major League baseball-pitcher
Christie Hefner (born 1952), former Chairman of Playboy Enterprises, daughter of Hugh Hefner
Don Heffner (1911–1989), American second-baseman
George E. Heffner (1923–2008), American politician
Hugh Hefner (1926–2017), founder of Playboy magazine
Jeremy Hefner (born 1986), MLB pitcher for the New York Mets
J. R. Heffner (born 1972), NASCAR driver
Keith Hefner, founder and executive director of Youth Communication, a nonprofit organization
Philip Hefner, Lutheran professor of the theology of evolution
Richard Heffner (1925–2013), TV talk show host, and professor at Rutgers Institute
Robert A. Hefner (1874–1971), Oilman, Oklahoma Hall of Fame 1949, OK Supreme Court Justice and Mayor of Oklahoma City
Robert A. Hefner, Jr. (born 1907), Oilman, Oklahoma Hall of Fame 1979 and Golden Gloves Boxer

See also
Hafner (disambiguation)
Haffner (disambiguation)
Höffner (disambiguation)